Landen's transformation is a mapping of the parameters of an elliptic integral, useful for the efficient numerical evaluation of elliptic functions. It was originally due to John Landen and independently rediscovered by Carl Friedrich Gauss.

Statement 

The incomplete elliptic integral of the first kind  is 

where  is the modular angle.

Landen's transformation can similarly be expressed in terms of the elliptic modulus  and its complement .

Complete elliptic integral

In Gauss's formulation, the value of the integral

Therefore,

From Landen's transformation we conclude

Proof

The transformation may be effected by integration by substitution.

A further substitution of  gives the desired result

This latter step is facilitated by writing the radical as

and the infinitesimal as

Arithmetic-geometric mean and Legendre's first integral

If the transformation is iterated a number of times, then the parameters  and  converge very rapidly to a common value, even if they are initially of different orders of magnitude. In the limit, the integrand becomes a constant, so that integration is trivial

The integral may also be recognized as a multiple of Legendre's complete elliptic integral of the first kind. Putting 

Hence, for any , the arithmetic-geometric mean and the complete elliptic integral of the first kind are related by

By performing an inverse transformation (reverse arithmetic-geometric mean iteration), that is

the relationship may be written as

which may be solved for the AGM of a pair of arbitrary arguments;

References

 Louis V. King On The Direct Numerical Calculation Of Elliptic Functions And Integrals (Cambridge University Press, 1924)

Elliptic functions